Bratton Fleming is a large village, civil parish and former manor near Barnstaple, in Devon, England. It lies a few miles west of Exmoor. The parish is surrounded, clockwise from the north, by the parishes of Challacombe, Brayford, Stoke Rivers, Goodleigh, Shirwell, Loxhore, Arlington and Kentisbury. The population of the parish in 2001 was 942, falling to 928 in 2011.
There is an electoral ward with the same name which at the 2011 census had a population of 2,117.

History
The former Manor of Bratton Fleming was owned by a succession of families from the Norman Conquest to the 19th century. The Flemings had their seat at Chimwell which Tristram Risdon described as "one of the largest demesnes of this shire". According to W. G. Hoskins, Chimwell is now a farmhouse called Chumhill. Other Domesday manors in the parish were Benton and Haxton. The great jurist Henry de Bracton (c. 1210 – c. 1268) was either born here or at Bratton Clovelly.

The village was once served by a railway station, supposedly 'the most beautiful in England', on the narrow gauge Lynton & Barnstaple Railway; the trackbed runs close to the village. The street names Station Road and Station Hill survive.

Church
St Peter's Church was rebuilt on the site of a much older building, in 1861.

Rev. Gascoigne Canham (d.1667), Rector of Arlington, whose mural monument exists in Arlington Church, and a relative by marriage to the Chichester family of Arlington (a cadet branch of the Chichesters of Raleigh and later of Youlston, lords of the manor of Bratton Fleming), purchased in 1665 the advowson of  Bratton Fleming, 2 1/2 miles south-east of Arlington, from Sir Francis Godolphin for £300,  and on 27 March 1667 he signed a deed granting the advowson in perpetuity to Gonville and Caius College, Cambridge, of which he was a member. He also gave £10 toward the "Combination Room" of that college.
A mural monument exists in St Peter's Church, Bratton Fleming, to  Rev. Bartholomew Wortley, the first rector to be appointed by Gonville & Caius College. He was aged about 50 when appointed and remained in office until his death in 1749 aged 97.

See also
Baron Slane
Henry de Bracton
Exmoor Steam Railway

References

External links
Bratton Fleming home page
Bratton Fleming at GENUKI
Bratton Fleming community page

Villages in Devon